Zugić is a surname. Notable people with the surname include:

Igor Zugic (born 1981), Canadian chess player and engineer
Goran Žugić (1963–2000), Montenegrin policeman and state security operative
Nikola Zugić (born 1990), Serbian footballer
Siniša Žugić (born 1969), Serbian diver